Jdeideh ( translit. al-Judaydat), also Jdayde, Jdaideh and Jdeidet el-Matn, is a coastal municipality and the administrative capital of the Matn District in the Mount Lebanon Governorate.

Jdeideh has an area of approximately 6 km². It is located in the northern suburbs of Beirut city that comprise Greater Beirut. The municipality is formed of three villages of Jdeidet el-Matn, Bauchrieh and Sed el Bauchrieh with a population of nearly 160,000 inhabitants. Jdeidet el-Matn has five municipal council members, while Bauchrieh has nine, and Sed el Bauchrieh has seven,

Jdeideh is an important industrial zone and a significant location for commercial and banking activity.

Archaeology

Three archaeological sites were found in the Jdeideh area by Jesuit fathers. Two of these featured finds of Heavy Neolithic flints of the Qaraoun culture.

It was discovered by Raoul Describes who retrieved knapped tools from several periods including Acheulean, Middle Paleolithic, Upper Paleolithic and Heavy Neolithic. This material is in the Saint Joseph University, Museum of Lebanese Prehistory.

An Upper Paleolithic assemblage in brown Cretaceous flint was found by Auguste Bergy including a variety of scrapers including a specialist variety also found at Ain Cheikh that were termed Grattoirs de côté.

Jdeideh III is on a wooded hilltop north northwest of Aamariyeh on the southwest slopes that was also found by Bergy. He recovered a Qaraoun culture type, Gigantolithic assemblage of massive choppers, scrapers on flakes and coarse picks.

References

External links
Jdeide Bouchrieh Sed Municipality
Ikamalebanon.com

Greater Beirut
Populated places in the Matn District
Christian cities in Lebanon
Maronite Christian communities in Lebanon

Archaeological sites in Lebanon
Heavy Neolithic sites
Paleolithic Asia